The following is a list of ecoregions in the Democratic Republic of the Congo, as identified by the World Wide Fund for Nature (WWF).

Terrestrial ecoregions
by major habitat type

Tropical and subtropical moist broadleaf forests

 Albertine Rift montane forests
 Atlantic Equatorial coastal forests
 Central Congolian lowland forests
 Eastern Congolian swamp forests
 Northeastern Congolian lowland forests
 Northwestern Congolian lowland forests
 Western Congolian swamp forests

Tropical and subtropical grasslands, savannas, and shrublands

 Angolan miombo woodlands
 Central Zambezian miombo woodlands
 East Sudanian savanna
 Itigi–Sumbu thicket
 Northern Congolian forest–savanna mosaic
 Southern Congolian forest–savanna mosaic
 Victoria Basin forest–savanna mosaic
 Western Congolian forest–savanna mosaic

Montane grasslands and shrublands

 Ruwenzori-Virunga montane moorlands

Flooded grasslands and savannas

 Zambezian flooded grasslands

Mangroves

 Central African mangroves

Freshwater ecoregions
by bioregion

West Coastal Equatorial

 Southern West Coastal Equatorial

Congo

 Albertine Highlands
 Bangweulu-Mweru
 Central Congo
 Cuvette Centrale
 Kasai
 Lower Congo
 Lower Congo Rapids
 Mai-Ndombe
 Malebo Pool
 Sudanic Congo (Oubangi)
 Thysville Caves
 Tumba
 Uele
 Upemba
 Upper Congo
 Upper Congo Rapids

Nilo-Sudan

 Upper Nile

Great Lakes

 Lake Tanganyika
 Lakes Kivu, Edward, George, and Victoria

Marine ecoregions
 Gulf of Guinea South

References
 Burgess, Neil, Jennifer D’Amico Hales, Emma Underwood (2004). Terrestrial Ecoregions of Africa and Madagascar: A Conservation Assessment. Island Press, Washington DC.
 Spalding, Mark D., Helen E. Fox, Gerald R. Allen, Nick Davidson et al. "Marine Ecoregions of the World: A Bioregionalization of Coastal and Shelf Areas". Bioscience Vol. 57 No. 7, July/August 2007, pp. 573-583.
 Thieme, Michelle L. (2005). Freshwater Ecoregions of Africa and Madagascar: A Conservation Assessment. Island Press, Washington DC.
 Toham, Andre Kamdem et al., eds. (2006). A Vision for Biodiversity Conservation in Central Africa: Biological Priorities for Conservation in the Guinean-Congolian Forest and Freshwater Region. World Wildlife Fund, Washington DC. Page A-52.

 
Ecoregions
Congo, Democratic Republic of